Kim Ok-sim (born 2 July 1987) is a North Korean football forward who played for the North Korea women's national football team at the 2008 Summer Olympics. At the club level, she played for Rimyongsu.

See also
 North Korea at the 2008 Summer Olympics

References

External links

 

1987 births
Living people
North Korean women's footballers
Place of birth missing (living people)
Footballers at the 2008 Summer Olympics
Olympic footballers of North Korea
Women's association football forwards
North Korea women's international footballers
2007 FIFA Women's World Cup players